
Year 852 (DCCCLII) was a leap year starting on Friday (link will display the full calendar) of the Julian calendar.

Events 
 By place 

 Europe 
 March 4 – Trpimir I, duke (knez) of Croatia, and founder of the Trpimirović dynasty, issues a first state document in Bijaći of all Slavonic peoples. In this Latin document Trpimir refers to himself as the "duke of the Croats" (dux Chroatorum), and to his country as the "state of the Croats" (regnum Chroatorum).
 Presian I, ruler (khan) of the Bulgarian Empire, dies after a 23-year reign in which the Bulgarians have expanded into Upper Macedonia and Serbia. He is succeeded by his son Boris I, as monarch of Bulgaria.
 Emperor Lothair I and his (half) brother Charles the Bald join forces to remove the Vikings from the island of Oscelles, in the River Seine. After this fails, Charles again pays them tribute (Danegeld).

 Britain 
 A Viking fleet of 350 vessels enters the Thames Estuary before turning north, and engages the Mercian forces under King Beorhtwulf. The Mercians are defeated, and retreat to their settlements. The Vikings then turn south and cross the river somewhere in Surrey; there they are slaughtered by a West Saxon army, led by King Æthelwulf and his son Aethelbald, at Oak Field (Aclea).
 King Æthelstan, the eldest son of Æthelwulf, is killed by a Viking raiding party. He is succeeded by his brother Æthelberht, who becomes sub-king of Kent, Essex, Surrey and Sussex (approximate date).
 Beorhtwulf dies after a 12-year reign, and is succeeded by his son Burgred as king of Mercia.

 Al-Andalus 
 Abd al-Rahman II, Umayyad emir of Córdoba, dies after a 30-year reign in which he has made additions to the Mosque–Cathedral at Córdoba. He is succeeded by his son Muhammad I, who will put down several revolts of the Muwalladun and Mozarabs in Muslim controlled areas in al-Andalus (modern Spain).

 By topic 
 Aviation 
 According to a 17th century account, the Andalusian inventor Abbas ibn Firnas makes a tower jump in Córdoba. He wraps himself with vulture feathers and attaches two wings to his arms. The alleged attempt to fly is not recorded in earlier sources and is ultimately unsuccessful, but the garment slows his fall enough that he only sustains minor injuries.

 Religion 
 Gandersheim Abbey in Lower Saxony (modern Germany) is founded by Duke Liudolf of Saxony.

Births 
 March 10 – Qian Liu, Chinese warlord and king (d. 932)
 Bořivoj I, duke of Bohemia (approximate date)
 Nicholas I Mystikos, Byzantine patriarch (d. 925)
 Yang Xingmi, Chinese governor (jiedushi) (d. 905)
 Ermengard of Italy, queen regent of Provence (d. 896)
 Zhang Quanyi, Chinese warlord (d. 926)
 Zhu Wen, emperor of Later Liang (d. 912)

Deaths 
 Abd al-Rahman II, Muslim emir of Córdoba (b. 792)
 Æthelstan, king of Kent (approximate date)
 Aleran, Frankish count and margrave
 Aurelius and Natalia, Christian martyrs
 Beorhtwulf (Bright Wolf), king of Mercia
 Du Mu, Chinese poet and official (b. 803)
 Fredelo, Frankish count (approximate date)
 Harald Klak, king of Denmark (approximate date)
 Íñigo Arista, king of Pamplona (or 851)
 Ishaq ibn Rahwayh, Muslim imam (or 853)
 Lambert II, Frankish count and prefect
 Li Jue, chancellor of the Tang Dynasty
 Presian I, ruler (khan) of the Bulgarian Empire

References